The Bangladesh cricket team toured South Africa from 5 to 30 November 2008. They played two Test matches, one Twenty20 International and three One Day Internationals against South Africa.

T20I series

Only T20I

ODI series

1st ODI

2nd ODI

3rd ODI

Test series

1st Test

2nd Test

Tour matches

First-class: South African Airways Challenge XI vs Bangladeshis

References

2008 in South African cricket
2008-09
International cricket competitions in 2008–09
2008–09 South African cricket season
2008 in Bangladeshi cricket